Daniel Fanger (born 11 August 1988) is a Swiss professional footballer who plays as a defender for SC Kriens in the Swiss Promotion League.

External links

1988 births
Living people
Sportspeople from Lucerne
Swiss men's footballers
Association football defenders
Swiss Super League players
Swiss Challenge League players
SC Kriens players
FC Luzern players
FC Aarau players